Edme Mentelle (11 October 1730 - 28 April 1816) was a French geographer.

Biography
Student of Jean-Baptiste Louis Crévier at the Collège de Beauvais (at the time a constituent college of the University of Paris), he found employment with the Ferme générale.

The poems and comedic plays he published early in his career were not successful. He turned to the study of geography and taught geography at the École Militaire during the 1760s. During the 1780s he taught geography to the royal household and in 1786 designed a globe, which is still on display in the Dauphin's apartments at the Palace of Versailles.

A supporter of the French Revolution, he taught at the Écoles centrales and at the École Normale Supérieure. He was elected to the Institut de France in 1795.

Academic staff of the University of Paris
1730 births
1816 deaths
Burials at Père Lachaise Cemetery
French geographers
French cartographers